Marianne's Ice Cream is an ice cream parlor located on Ocean Street in Santa Cruz, California.

History
Marianne's Ice Cream was opened by Tom Baker in 1947 and named for his daughters, Mary and Annie. The shop had gone through an unknown seller before a real estate agent approached Sam and Dorothy Lieberman about entering the ice cream industry using the building, the Lieberman's agreed and bought the property in 1958. In 2012, after 55 years in business and over 250 ice cream flavors created, Sam sold the shop to Kelly Dillon and Charlie Wilcox. In 2014 a satellite location was opened on State Park Drive in Aptos, California.

Reception

Cosmopolitan Magazine included Marianne's Ice Cream in a list of 41 "Instagram-worthy" ice cream shops in the United States.

References

External links
 Official site

Companies based in Santa Cruz, California
Ice cream parlors in the United States
1947 establishments in California